Andrei Mikhailovich Mozalev (born 24 March 2003) is a Russian figure skater. He is the 2019 CS Warsaw Cup champion, the 2022 Russian national bronze medalist, 2020 World Junior champion and the winner of three ISU Junior Grand Prix events (2019 JGP Latvia, 2019 JGP Croatia, 2018 JGP Czech Republic).

Personal life 
Mozalev was born on 24 March 2003 in Saint Petersburg, Russia.

Career

Early years 
Mozalev began learning to skate in 2008. He is coached by Kirill Davydenko.

2016–2017 season 
In November 2016, Mozalev made his international junior-level debut at the 2016 Volvo Open Cup, where he won the gold medal. Three weeks later, he won another gold medal at the 2016 NRW Trophy.

2017–2018 season 
In November 2017, Mozalev won his third international gold medal at the 2017 Tallinn Trophy.

At the 2018 Russian Junior Championships, Mozalev finished seventeenth. He ranked fourth in the short program but was last (eighteenth) in the free skate.

2018–2019 season 
In late September 2018, Mozalev made his Junior Grand Prix debut in Ostrava, Czech Republic, where he won the gold medal. He ranked second in the short program but won the free skate and outscored the silver medalist, Camden Pulkinen, by a margin of about five points. At his second JGP event of the season, he placed sixth in Yerevan, Armenia.

2019–2020 season 
In early September 2019, Mozalev won his second JGP gold medal at the 2019 JGP event in Riga, Latvia. He ranked first in both the short program and the free skate and scored his personal best score of 223.72 points. He outscored the silver medalist, South Korean Lee Si-hyeong, by about five points. Mozalev won his second event in Croatia and was the only man to win both of his events in the season.  Competing on the senior level, he won gold at the 2019 CS Warsaw Cup.

Qualifying in first position to the 2019–20 JGP Final, he placed first in the short program.  Second in the free skate, he won the silver medal behind Shun Sato.  He attributed a fall on his triple Axel to difficulty maintaining focus in the second half of his program.

At the 2020 Russian Championships, Mozalev placed second in the short program, only half a point behind leader Makar Ignatov.  A ninth-place free skate with two quad errors and a fall on a double Axel dropped him to fifth place overall.  Mozalev's coach subsequently said he had taken ill.  Competing at the 2020 Winter Youth Olympics, Mozalev won the silver medal in the men's event and a bronze medal in the team event.

Following a bronze medal finish at the Russian Junior Championships, Mozalev was assigned to one of Russia's three men's berths at the 2020 World Junior Championships in Tallinn, Estonia.  He placed narrowly second in the short program, behind Youth Olympic champion Yuma Kagiyama.  Mozalev then won the free skate, his only error being a hand down on one triple Axel attempt, and won the title.

2020–2021 season 
Mozalev debuted at the senior Russian test skates, including the quad flip jump, which he landed in the short program. Competing on the domestic Cup of Russia series, he won the silver medals at both the third stage in Sochi and the fourth stage in Kazan, encountering difficulties in the short program at both events but rallying in the free skates.

With the COVID-19 pandemic continuing to affect international travel, the ISU opted to run the Grand Prix based primarily on geographic location.  Mozalev made his senior Grand Prix debut at the 2020 Rostelecom Cup, landing his quad flip in the short program but botching his jump combination, ending in sixth place in that segment.  He was second in the free skate, despite doubling another planned quad flip, and rose to fourth place, less than two points behind bronze medalist Petr Gumennik.

Competing at the 2021 Russian Championships, Mozalev took a "painful" fall on a downgraded quad flip to open his short program, placing fourth in that segment nonetheless.  He landed the quad flip in the free skate, but a series of subsequent jump errors put him in fifth in that segment, remaining in fourth place overall.

Following the national championships, Mozalev competed in the 2021 Channel One Trophy, a televised event organized in lieu of the cancelled European Championships.  He was selected for the Red Machine team captained by Alina Zagitova. He was fifth in the short program and fourth in the free skate, while the Red Machine won the trophy.  After this, Mozalev prepared for the Russian Cup Final, which was widely assumed to be the deciding event for the second Russian men's berth at the 2021 World Championships in Stockholm. Mozalev was second in the short program despite doing only a triple flip instead of a quad. He fell three times in the free skate, dropping to fourth place overall.

2021–2022 season 
Mozalev opened his season at the 2021 CS Denis Ten Memorial Challenge, winning the bronze medal. Assigned to only one Grand Prix, he was seventh at the 2021 Internationaux de France. After an error-riddled short program left him in ninth place, he finished second in the free skate, but this only raised him two ordinals in the final standings. 

At the 2022 Russian Championships, Mozalev placed eighth in the short program after falling on an underrotated quad Salchow. Second in the free skate, despite a fall on a triple Axel, he won the bronze medal. Despite this, he was not named to the Russian team for the European Championships, the third berth being given to nationals fourth-place finisher Evgeni Semenenko. However, he was subsequently added to the European team following the withdrawal of Mikhail Kolyada, and won the short program with a new personal best, taking a gold small medal. After several jump errors in the free skate, he placed sixth in that segment and dropped to fourth place overall. He was the second of the three Russians at the event, behind Mark Kondratiuk (the gold medalist) and ahead of Semenenko in fifth. On January 20, he was officially named to the Russian Olympic team along with Kondratiuk and Kolyada.

Competing at the 2022 Winter Olympics, Mozalev performed poorly in the short program of the Olympic men's event, making multiple jump errors and finishing twenty-third in the segment to narrowly qualify to the free skate. He fared somewhat better in the free skate, placing eighteenth in that segment and rising to overall nineteenth position.

Programs

Competitive highlights 

CS: Challenger Series; JGP: Junior Grand Prix

Detailed results 
Current ISU world best highlighted in bold and italic.

Senior

Junior

References

External links 
 

2003 births
Russian male single skaters
Living people
Figure skaters from Saint Petersburg
Figure skaters at the 2020 Winter Youth Olympics
World Junior Figure Skating Championships medalists
Figure skaters at the 2022 Winter Olympics
Olympic figure skaters of Russia